Germano Meneghel (1961 – June 13, 2011) was a Brazilian musician and singer-songwriter. Meneghel was a lead vocalist of Olodum, an internationally known cultural and musical group based in Salvador, Brazil.

Meneghel was responsible for writing some of Olodum's most well known songs, including Avisa Lá and Alegria Geral.

Meneghel suffered from health problems, including hypertension and had complained of chest pains shortly before his death in 2011. Meneghel died at his home in the Pero Vaz neighborhood of Salvador, Brazil, on June 13, 2011, at the age of 49.

References

2011 deaths
20th-century Brazilian male singers
20th-century Brazilian singers
Brazilian male singer-songwriters
People from Salvador, Bahia
Samba musicians
1961 births